Émile Golaz (21 September 1927 – 10 December 2007) was a Swiss professional ice hockey player. He competed with the Switzerland men's national ice hockey team at both the 1952 and 1956 Winter Olympic Games.

External links
Émile Golaz's profile at Sports-Reference.com

1927 births
2007 deaths
Ice hockey players at the 1952 Winter Olympics
Ice hockey players at the 1956 Winter Olympics
Olympic ice hockey players of Switzerland
Swiss ice hockey forwards
People from Jura-North Vaudois District
Sportspeople from the canton of Vaud